The men's heavyweight (91 kg/200.2 lbs) Full-Contact category at the W.A.K.O. World Championships 2007 in Coimbra was the second heaviest of the male Full-Contact tournaments involving fifteen fighters from four continents (Europe, Asia, North America and Oceania).  Each of the matches was three rounds of two minutes each and were fought under Full-Contact rules.

Due to the fact there was one too few fighters for a tournament made for sixteen, one of the men had a bye through to the quarter finals.  The tournament gold medallist was the Russian Roman Beskishkov who defeated 2008 Olympic Games boxer Milorad Gajović from Montenegro in the final by split decision.  The bronze medal positions went to Pole Bartlomiej Bocian (who had also won a bronze in the Light-Contact event at the world championship in Belgrade a month or so previously) and Denis Simkin from the Ukraine.

Results

Key

See also
List of WAKO Amateur World Championships
List of WAKO Amateur European Championships
List of male kickboxers

References

External links
 WAKO World Association of Kickboxing Organizations Official Site

Kickboxing events at the WAKO World Championships 2007 Coimbra
2007 in kickboxing
Kickboxing in Portugal